The following is a list of African Boxing Union champions. The African Boxing Union (ABU) is a professional boxing governing body that sanctions championship bouts in Africa.

Heavyweight
As of 9 December 2017

Cruiserweight
As of 28 May 2021

Light-heavyweight
As of 28 April 2017

Super-middleweight
As of 1 December 2018

Middleweight
As of 8 June 2019

Super-welterweight
As of 13 May 2016

Welterweight
As of 20 July 2017

Super-lightweight
As of 20 October 2018

Lightweight
As of 21 April 2019

Super-featherweight
As of 18 May 2018

Featherweight
As of 7 December 2019

Super-bantamweight
As of 15 September 2019

Bantamweight
As of 24 August 2019

Super-flyweight
As of 16 December 2019

Flyweight
As of 30 December 2017

Light-flyweight
As of 21 October 2018

Minimumweight
As of 29 July 2018

Footnotes

References

Lists of boxing champions